Southampton Municipal Golf Course is a 27-hole golf course in Southampton, England. The par 70, 6174yd, 18-hole course is set in mature parkland. It is home to Southampton Golf Club.

History

Background 
After World War I, Sir Sidney Kimber envisaged the council providing leisure activities to the people of Southampton. Until this point, the majority of private clubs were fairly exclusive and ‘the working man’ was not invited.

Completion 
The course was designed by five time Open Championship winner J.H. Taylor, and was completed in 1935. However, it wasn’t until after World War II that it became playable throughout the year.

Impact of Covid-19 pandemic

Covid-19 struggles 
Due to the COVID-19 restrictions caused by the COVID-19 pandemic in the United Kingdom, leisure centres were forced to closed for months in line with government guidelines.

On 1 April 2021, Southampton City Council took over the management of the golf course after the previous operator had been hit by the pandemic.

Southampton City Council and recovery 
Following the change in management to Southampton City Council, essential grounds work was carried out on the golf course to bring it back to use. Plugs of soil were removed from the green and a feed, seed and sand mix was spread to rejuvenate the putting surfaces, whilst irrigation work was also carried out.

In late 2021, further work was completed on the golf course, including improvements to the greens, drainage, the playability of the course, paths along with other improvements.

The council will also be improving the cottages. However, a recent bat survey revealed the presence of roosting bats within the cottages, which are legally protected, and are working with an ecologist to ensure the refurbishment is carried out correctly and in line with the National England mitigation license that has been granted.

References

Golf clubs and courses in Hampshire
Sport in Southampton